Joseph or Joe Russell may refer to:

Joseph Russell (judge) (1702–1780), chief justice of the Rhode Island Supreme Court
Joseph Russell (shipbuilder) (1786–1855), Scottish-Canadian businessman
Joseph Russell (New York politician) (1800–1875), U.S. Representative from New York
Joseph J. Russell (1854–1922), U.S. Representative from Missouri
Joseph E. Russell (1864–1940), Wisconsin State Assemblyman, farmer, and teacher
Joseph Russell (Canadian politician) (1868–1925), Toronto businessman and politician
Joe Russell (footballer) (1898–1976), Australian football player
Joe Russell (tennis) (born 1961), American tennis player
Joe Russell (backgammon), American backgammon player

See also
Jo Russell (born 1970), English DJ